Kamil Wojtkowski (born 26 February 1998) is a Polish professional footballer who plays as a midfielder for Polish club Motor Lublin.

Club career
Wojtkowski started playing football at his local team, OSiR Sokołów Podlaski. In 2010, he joined Legia Warsaw, where he spent four years.

Kamil joined Fulham FC youth squad during summer 2013, where he trained and played for about half of the year however, Legia and Fulham were unable to reach the terms so Wojtkowki returned to Poland to join Pogoń.

In 2014, Wojtkowski joined Pogoń Szczecin. On 18 October 2014, he made his Ekstraklasa debut for Pogoń, coming on as a substitute in second half of away match against Jagiellonia Białystok. By doing so, he became youngest player ever to make appearance for the club, aged 16 years and 234 days.

On 29 June 2015, Wojtkowski signed for 2. Bundesliga club RB Leipzig and played in the U19 team.

On 3 July 2017 he signed a contract with Wisła Kraków. On 30 July 2020 he left Wisła, as his contract was not extended. On 3 November 2020 he was announced as Jagiellonia Białystok player. On 23 March 2021 his contract was terminated.

In 2021 he was a footballer for the Greek Volos, where he played 8 Super League matches and 2 in the Greek Cup. On 22 December 2021, his contract with the club was terminated by mutual agreement.

On 12 January 2022, Wojtkowski joined the Cypriot club Ethnikos Achna. He made his first appearance for the club on 15 January, coming on as a substitute for Artūrs Karašausks in a 4–0 Cypriot First Division home defeat against APOEL. Wojtkowski netted his first goal on 7 February, scoring deep into stoppage time as Ethnikos recorded a 2–0 victory over Omonia.

On 12 October 2022, Wojtkowski returned to Poland to join II liga side Motor Lublin until June 2024.

References

External links

1998 births
People from Sokołów County
Sportspeople from Masovian Voivodeship
Living people
Polish footballers
Poland youth international footballers
Association football midfielders
Pogoń Szczecin players
RB Leipzig players
Wisła Kraków players
Jagiellonia Białystok players
Volos N.F.C. players
Ethnikos Achna FC players
Motor Lublin players
Regionalliga players
III liga players
Ekstraklasa players
Super League Greece players
Cypriot First Division players
Polish expatriate footballers
Expatriate footballers in Germany
Polish expatriate sportspeople in Germany
Expatriate footballers in Greece
Polish expatriate sportspeople in Greece
Expatriate footballers in Cyprus
Polish expatriate sportspeople in Cyprus